Neasura taprobana is a moth of the subfamily Arctiinae first described by George Hampson in 1907. It is found in Sri Lanka.

References

Moths described in 1907
Lithosiini